The Chilhuil sea catfish (Bagre panamensis), also called the Chihuil, is a species of sea catfish in the family Ariidae. It was described by Theodore Gill in 1863, originally under the genus Aelurichthys. It inhabits subtropical marine and brackish waters in the eastern Pacific region, including California, USA; Colombia, Guatemala, Peru, El Salvador, Costa Rica, Ecuador, Honduras, Nicaragua, Panama and Mexico.

The Chilhuil sea catfish is of important commercial value to fisheries, and is sold fresh. It has been consumed since pre-Columbian times. Due to its wide distribution in the eastern Pacific, as well as a lack of known threats or observed population decline, the IUCN redlist currently lists the species as Least Concern. It notes that the species' range partially includes areas under marine protection.

References

Chilhuil sea catfish
Fish of Mexican Pacific coast
Western Central American coastal fauna
Fish of Colombia
Fish of Ecuador
Fish of Peru
Freshwater fish of Mexico
Freshwater fish of Central America
Freshwater fish of South America
Freshwater fish of Colombia
Freshwater fish of Ecuador
Freshwater fish of Peru
Galápagos Islands coastal fauna
Chilhuil sea catfish
Chilhuil sea catfish